Rudi Sigl (born 12 October 1937) is a German former sports shooter. He competed in the 50 metre rifle, three positions and the 50 metre rifle, prone events at the 1956 Summer Olympics.

References

External links
 

1937 births
Living people
German male sport shooters
Olympic shooters of the United Team of Germany
Shooters at the 1956 Summer Olympics
People from Rosenheim (district)
Sportspeople from Upper Bavaria